Aforia inoperculata is a species of sea snail, a marine gastropod mollusk in the family Cochlespiridae.

Description

Distribution
This marine species occurs off East Japan.

References

 Sysoev, A.V. & Kantor, Yu.I. (1988) Three new species of deep-sea mollusks of the genus Aforia (Gastropoda, Toxoglossa: Turridae). Apex, 3, 39–46 page(s): 39

External links
 BioLib: Aforia inoperculata

inoperculata
Gastropods described in 1988